Clube Desportivo de Cinfães is a Portuguese sports club from Cinfães, Viseu District.

The men's football team played on the third tier until being relegated from the 2018–19 Campeonato de Portugal, and plays regularly in the Taça de Portugal. The team notably reached the fifth round of the 2008–09 Taça de Portugal.

References

Football clubs in Portugal
Viseu District
Association football clubs established in 1931
1931 establishments in Portugal